Geodermatophilus poikilotrophus is a Gram-positive and aerobic bacterium from the genus Geodermatophilus which has been isolated from dolomitic marble from Samara in Namibia.

References

Bacteria described in 2015
Actinomycetia